Archips vivesi is a moth of the  family Tortricidae. It is found in Vietnam.

The wingspan is 18 mm. The ground colour of the forewings is brownish cream, but paler in the costal area to about 1/3 and more brownish ferruginous otherwise. The strigulation is dense and brown. The markings are atrophied. The hindwings are brownish and hardly tinged cream at the apex.

Etymology
The species is named in honour of Dr. Antonio Vives Moreno.

References

Archips
Moths described in 2009
Moths of Asia
Taxa named by Józef Razowski